Verity Marina Marshall is an English actress best known for her roles as Amy in the White Christmas episode of the series Black Mirror, and Samantha in the BBC six-part drama Press.

Early life

Marshall was born in Hammersmith, London. She graduated from the Oxford School of Drama in 2010.

Career
Marshall started her career on the Channel 4 comedy sketch show TNT Show starring Jack Whitehall.

Following her role in the stage adaptation of James Kennaway's Some Gorgeous Accident at West End Theatre, Trafalgar studios, she played the part of Clementine Churchill in the BBC4 docudrama Churchill's First World War opposite Adam James. Marshall worked with director and producer Adam Kemp again in BBC2's Gunpowder 5/11: The Greatest Terror Plot, in which she played the part of Gertrude Wintour. The film tells the story of the final days of the gunpowder conspirators after 5/11 using the actual words of Thomas Wintour, played by Jamie Thomas King.

Marshall appeared in the seventh episode of historical drama, The British, which aired on Sky Atlantic on 7 September 2012 and starred Timothy West and Ioan Gruffud, and the third and fourth episodes of The Great War: The People's Story, starring Olivia Colman, James Norton and Alison Steadman, which aired on ITV1 on 10 August 2014.

In December 2014 Marshall played the part Amy in Charlie Brooker's Christmas special of Black Mirror, titled White Christmas, which aired on Channel 4 on 16 December 2014. The episode starred Jon Hamm and Rafe Spall.

In 2016 Marshall played Anna in MGM's Me Before You starring Emilia Clarke and Sam Claflin. The film, adapted from Jojo Moyes bestselling novel, tells the story a young Englishwoman who is hired as the caretaker for an affluent Londoner paralysed in a tragic accident. That same year she guest starred in the Halloween special of the eighteenth series of the BBC One medical drama television series Doctors which aired on 31 October 2016.

In spring 2017 Marshall played the lead in the fourth series of American drama, Obsession: Dark Desires produced by October Films. The series dramatises real life accounts from people who have been the victim of stalking. Later that year she starred as Amy Therrialt in Talos Media (The Vikings, The Bible) drama, Kiss of Death  and Arrow media docudrama, Intruders  both aired in the US.

In autumn 2018 Marshall appeared opposite Charlotte Riley and Ben Chaplin in the BBC drama, Press written by Mike Bartlett and directed by Tom Vaughan. The 6x60 series is set in the fast-paced and challenging environment of the British newspaper industry and will broadcast on BBC One and PBS following the UK broadcast.

Marshall has also starred in a number of television commercials for brands such as House of Fraser, Head and Shoulders, Vodafone, Raffaelo, Fruit of the Loom, Persil, Experian, Żywiec Brewery, Coop (Switzerland), Allianz and George clothing.

Personal life

Marshall is actively involved in campaigning for the rights of displaced people. In November 2015, after completing shooting on Me Before You, Marshall travelled to Samos, Greece to volunteer with the refugees traveling from the Turkish coast to Europe. In June 2016 she spoke at the Next Century Foundation's Middle Eastern Migration Conference in Westminster on ways of countering human trafficking and modern slavery. In September 2016, Marshall was interviewed on the Arab News Network's The English Hour about her stance on the refugee crisis, immigration and combating prejudice and racism following the Brexit result. The program is modeled on the BBC's HARDtalk which is recorded in London, broadcast at peak time and subtitled in Arabic.

Filmography

References

External links

English film actresses
Actresses from London
Alumni of the Oxford School of Drama
Living people
English television actresses
20th-century English actresses
21st-century English actresses
Year of birth missing (living people)